Year 1357 (MCCCLVII) was a common year starting on Sunday (link will display the full calendar) of the Julian calendar.

Events 
 January–December 
 February 3 – The Estates General in France meets and passes Étienne Marcel's Great Ordinance in an attempt to impose limits on the monarchy, in particular in fiscal and monetary matters.
 April 28 – Erik Magnusson is recognized as king of most of Sweden, in opposition to his father, King Magnus.
 May 28 – Peter I becomes King of Portugal, after the death of his father, Alfonso IV.
 July 9 – Formal start of construction on Charles Bridge in Prague.
 July 22 – On the death of Jani Beg, he is succeeded as Khan of the Blue Horde by his son Berdi Beg who orders the death of at least 12 of his close kinsmen to secure his position.
 October 3 – The Treaty of Berwick ends the Second War of Scottish Independence and King David II of Scotland is released by the English in return for a ransom.

 Date unknown 
 The Blue Horde unseats Ghazan II as the ruler of the Il-Khanate, and appoints their own governor.
 Battle of Bubat: The Sundanese royal family is massacred by the Majapahit Army on the orders of Gajah Mada; the death toll includes Sundanese King Lingga Buana and Princess Dyah Pitaloka Citraresmi, who commits suicide.
 Rao Kanhadev becomes Rathore ruler of Marwar (part of modern-day India).
 Influenza is first identified as a disease.
 The first public exhibition of the Shroud of Turin is recorded.
 The Wat Phra Si Rattana Mahathat (Famous Wat Yai) Temple is constructed in Phitsanulok, Thailand.

Births 
 April 11 – King John I of Portugal (d. 1433)
 date unknown
 Art mac Art MacMurrough-Kavanagh, King of Leinster (d. 1417)
 Hugo von Montfort, Austrian minstrel (d. 1423)
 Anna of Trebizond, Queen of Georgia (d. 1406)
 Fang Xiaoru, Confucian scholar (d. 1402)
 Je Tsongkhapa, founder of the Geluk school of Tibetan Buddhism (d. 1419)

Deaths 
 January 18 – Maria of Portugal, infanta (b. 1313)
 May 28 – King Afonso IV of Portugal (b. 1291)
 July 13 – Bartolus de Saxoferrato, Italian jurist (b. 1313)
 date unknown
 Usman Serajuddin, court scholar of the Bengal Sultanate (b. 1258)
 Ziauddin Barani, historian and political thinker of the Delhi Sultanate (b. 1285)
 Jani Beg, Khan of the Blue Horde
 Kazerouni, Masoud, Persian physician
 Rao Tida, Rathore ruler of Marwar

References